Labason, officially the Municipality of Labason (Subanen: Benwa Labason; Chavacano: Municipalidad de Labason), is a 3rd class municipality in the province of Zamboanga del Norte, Philippines. According to the 2020 census, it has a population of 43,934 people.

Labason's commercial buildings have improved over the past years.

Murcielagos Island is within the municipal jurisdiction of Labason.

Etymology 
The name “Labason” before it came to be had a number of names.  Several versions regarding its derivation were gathered, but the most widely known among them is that Labason is from the word “Lab-as”, a Visayan term which means “Fresh Fish”.  This place was known for its abundance of fresh fish and it is till even up to now.  Early traders called it “Lab-asan”.

History
The original inhabitants of this place and other sitios were Subanons who lived a nomadic life. Later, Muslim missionaries claimed them as their subjects.

Economic and social conditions of the native were improved when Labason was made a Municipal District. The people taught and encouraged to plant crops, raised all sorts of agricultural products and domesticated farm animals.

In accordance with the Code of Mindanao and Sulu, on July 10, 1916, this place was transformed into a municipal district, making Panganuran the seat of government under Zamboanga. The extent of its jurisdiction was from Baliguian to Banigan.  Due to the increase in population and other factors favorable to development that then existed, the seat of government was transferred from Panganuran to Labason.

Mandag Kawan, a Subano, was appointed as the first municipal district president with Don Juan Moro as the vice president. Later Don Juan Moro also became the first district president when Labason became the seat of government and then followed by District President Hatib Layling, a Muslim with Bagti Sangkayan as vice president.

Gil Sanchez, Sr. and Nemesio Fortich were the first Christian president and vice president respectively. They served their district from 1934 to 1937.

When Sindangan was created into a municipality, Labason became one of its barrios. Several years later, the socio-economic condition of Labason has improved and the people felt the need to be independent from Sindangan. Such wish was granted in 1948 where it became the first municipality to be carved out from its mother town.

By virtue of Executive No. 79 signed by the late President Manuel Roxas on August 12, 1947, Labason was created into a municipality.

In 1959, the sitios of Bacong, Gabong, Pitawe and Banga-an were constituted into the barrio of Pitawe.

Geography

Barangays
Labason is politically subdivided into 20 barangays.

Climate

Demographics

Economy

References

External links
 Labason Profile at PhilAtlas.com
 [ Philippine Standard Geographic Code]
Philippine Census Information

Municipalities of Zamboanga del Norte